Salvatore Pelliccioni (born 25 January 1933) is a Sammarinese former sports shooter. He competed in the trap event at the 1968 Summer Olympics.

References

1933 births
Living people
Sammarinese male sport shooters
Italian male sport shooters
Italian people of Sammarinese descent
Olympic shooters of San Marino
Shooters at the 1968 Summer Olympics
Sportspeople from Rimini